In 1951, Billboard magazine published Best Selling Retail Rhythm & Blues Records and Most Played Juke Box Rhythm & Blues Records, two charts covering the top-performing songs in the United States in rhythm and blues (R&B) and related African-American-oriented music genres. The charts, one based on sales in stores and the other on plays in jukeboxes, are considered part of the lineage of the magazine's multimetric R&B chart launched in 1958, which since 2005 has been published under the title Hot R&B/Hip-Hop Songs.

In the issue of Billboard dated January 6, Ruth Brown was at number one on the juke box chart with "Teardrops from My Eyes", retaining its position from the final chart of 1950, and Amos Milburn moved into the top spot on the best sellers listing with "Bad, Bad Whiskey".  Beginning in early March, ballad singer and pianist Charles Brown achieved the year's longest unbroken spell at number one on both listings with his song "Black Night"; it spent 14 consecutive weeks atop the juke box chart and 13 consecutive weeks at number one on the best sellers chart.  The longest-running number one on the best sellers chart overall, however, was "Sixty Minute Man" by the Dominoes, with 14 non-consecutive weeks in the top spot, including one tied with another song.  The only act with more than one R&B chart-topper in 1951 was the pioneering doo-wop group the Clovers, who reached number one on the best sellers chart with both "Don't You Know I Love You" and "Fool, Fool, Fool"; the latter also topped the juke box chart and was the year's final chart-topper on that listing.

In June, "Rocket 88" by Jackie Brenston and his Delta Cats topped both charts, spending three weeks at number one on the best sellers chart and five on the juke box listing.  The recording was by the regular backing band of singer Ike Turner, with saxophone player Brenston providing the vocals and receiving featured credit.  The song has been cited as pivotal in the development of rock and roll music, with some critics considering it to be the first rock and roll record.  Despite the success of the song, it would prove to be the only charting single of Brenston's career.  The same fate befell Jimmy Nelson and the Peter Rabbit Trio, who spent a single week at number one on the juke box listing in November with their first chart entry, "T' 99 Blues", but would never chart again.  Several other acts achieved their first number ones in 1951, beginning with the Dominoes with "Sixty Minute Man".  The Clovers reached the peak position on the juke box chart with "Don't You Know I Love You", their first charting song, and added their second number one later in the year with their next single.  The Five Keys also reached the top spot with their first chart entry, their recording of Benny Goodman's 1936 song "The Glory of Love".  In November and December, "Peppermint" Harris, Tab Smith and Earl Bostic all gained their first number ones, but in each case it would prove to be their final charting single.

Chart history

a.  Two songs tied for number one on the best sellers chart in this issue.

References

Works cited

1951
1951 record charts
1951 in American music